2678 Aavasaksa, provisional designation , is a stony Flora asteroid from the inner regions of the asteroid belt, approximately 8 kilometers in diameter.

The asteroid was discovered on 24 February 1938, by Finnish astronomer Yrjö Väisälä at Turku Observatory in Southwest Finland. It was named for the Aavasaksa hill in Finland.

Orbit and classification 

The S-type asteroid is a member of the Flora family, one of the largest groups of stony asteroids in the main-belt. It orbits the Sun in the inner main-belt at a distance of 2.1–2.5 AU once every 3 years and 5 months (1,240 days). Its orbit has an eccentricity of 0.09 and an inclination of 3° with respect to the ecliptic.

Its observation arc begins at Mount Wilson Observatory in 1935, or 3 years prior to its official discovery observation at Turku.

Physical characteristics 

In January 2009, a provisional and fragmentary photometric lightcurve of Aavasaksa was obtained at the Via Capote Observatory in California. Lightcurve analysis gave it a longer than average rotation period of 24 hours with a brightness amplitude of 0.4 in magnitude.

According to the survey carried out by the NEOWISE mission of NASA's space-based Wide-field Infrared Survey Explorer, Aavasaksa measures 8.4 kilometers in diameter and its surface has an albedo of 0.28, while the Collaborative Asteroid Lightcurve Link assumes an albedo of 0.24, derived from 8 Flora, the Flora family's largest member and namesake, and calculates a diameter of 8.2 kilometers.

Naming 

This minor planet is named after Aavasaksa, a sharp-edged hill in Finnish Lapland, just south of the Arctic Circle. The hill is located in the Tornio River Valley, after which the minor planet 1471 Tornio is named, and is often considered the southernmost point in Finland, where the natural phenomenon of the midnight sun is visible each June. The official naming citation was published by the Minor Planet Center on 26 May 1983 .

References

External links 
 Asteroid Lightcurve Database (LCDB), query form (info )
 Dictionary of Minor Planet Names, Google books
 Asteroids and comets rotation curves, CdR – Observatoire de Genève, Raoul Behrend
 Discovery Circumstances: Numbered Minor Planets (1)-(5000) – Minor Planet Center
 
 

002678
Discoveries by Yrjö Väisälä
Named minor planets
19380224